Ana Ortiz (born January 25, 1971) is an American actress and singer. Having pursued a career in ballet and singing from a young age, she eventually attended University of the Arts. Ortiz began her acting career in theatre, in early 2000s starred in the short-lived NBC sitcoms Kristin (2001) and A.U.S.A. (2003), and had recurring roles on Over There and Boston Legal.

Ortiz garnered widespread attention for her role as Hilda Suarez in the ABC comedy-drama series Ugly Betty from 2006 to 2010. She also appeared in such films like Labor Pains (2009) and Big Mommas: Like Father, Like Son (2011), and starred in Little Girl Lost: The Delimar Vera Story (2008). From 2013 to 2016, Ortiz starred as Marisol Suarez in the Lifetime television comedy-drama series Devious Maids, for which she received the Imagen Award for Best Actress - Television. In 2020, Ortiz began starring in the Hulu series Love, Victor as Isabel Salazar, mother of the title character Victor Salazar.

Life and career

Early life and career in theatre
Ortiz was born in New York City, and is the daughter of Angel Ortiz, a former Philadelphia City Council member of Puerto Rican descent, and an Irish-American mother, Kathleen Kuhlman. As a child, Ortiz studied ballet for eight years, until the pain of dancing en pointe forced her to pursue a different artistic discipline. Ortiz graduated from University of the Arts in Philadelphia.

Switching to singing, Ortiz attended the Fiorello H. LaGuardia High School of Music & Art and Performing Arts in New York City and later the University of the Arts in Philadelphia before making her professional stage debut in a regional theater production of Dangerous Liaisons. Her additional stage credits include portraying Chrissy in a European touring production of Hair, regional theater productions such as Dog Lady and the Cuban Swimmer and in the South Coast Repertory Theater's production of References to Salvador Dalí Make Me Hot. After joining LAByrinth Theatre Company, she appeared Off-Broadway in In Arabia We'd All Be Kings, directed by Academy Award-winning actor Philip Seymour Hoffman and named one of the 10-best plays of 1999 by the magazine Time Out New York.

Ortiz appeared in several television shows including NYPD Blue, Everybody Loves Raymond, Commander In Chief, ER, and The New Adventures of Old Christine. She had her first series regular role in short-lived NBC comedy series Kristin (2001). She later starred in another short-lived sitcom, called A.U.S.A. in 2003, and later had recurring roles in the FX drama Over There, and ABC series Boston Legal.

2006–2010: Ugly Betty and other roles

In 2006, Ortiz was cast as Hilda Suarez, the lead character's sister, in the ABC comedy-drama series Ugly Betty. Originally, Ortiz had auditioned for the Betty Suarez role, saying in 2008, "I was super plain. I just put on some glasses and kept my hair kind of flat and layered on the clothing", describing what she wore when auditioning for the role of Betty. "I just wanted them to remember me, so that I could be involved in the future".

In addition to her role on Ugly Betty, Ortiz was active in films, which include starring roles in Tortilla Heaven and Labor Pains. She also had a voice role in Batman: Gotham Knight, and starred in the made-for-television movie Little Girl Lost: The Delimar Vera Story in 2008. Ortiz also had a guest-starring role on Army Wives during its second season, playing a waitress named Sandi. She also appeared in the 2010 music video for Enrique Iglesias and Juan Luis Guerra's "Cuando me enamoro".

2010–present: Devious Maids and later

After Ugly Betty ended in 2010, Ortiz was cast as lead character in the ABC drama pilot True Blue about San Francisco homicide detectives reunited to solve the murder of one of their own. The pilot was not picked up to series. The following year she appeared in the comedy film Big Mommas: Like Father, Like Son, and starred in another pilot, called Outnumbered for Fox, her second pilot not picked up to series. She later had a recurring role on the HBO comedy series Hung. Ortiz also starred in the independent films Sleeping with the Fishes, and Such Good People.

In 2012, Ortiz was cast as a lead character on the ABC comedy drama pilot Devious Maids. While ABC chose not to pick it up to series, Lifetime picked up the pilot with a thirteen-episode order. The series premiered June 23, 2013, on Lifetime with positive reviews from critics. In the show, she plays the lead role of Marisol Duarte (the alias of Professor Marisol Suarez). Also in 2013, Ortiz was special guest star in the ABC primetime soap opera, Revenge, as Bizzy Preston. In 2014, Ortiz guest-starred in episodes of two ABC shows: How to Get Away with Murder and Black-ish.

In 2014 Ortiz was cast in the gay-drama film Love is All You Need? (2016), based on the 2011 short film with the same name. She did voice over work in the 2018 film Ralph Breaks the Internet.

Devious Maids was canceled after four seasons, in 2016. The following year, Ortiz starred in her third unsold pilot, a comedy called Charlie Foxtrot. Since 2019, Ortiz appears in the main cast of the comedy drama Whiskey Cavalier, playing FBI profiler Susan Sampson.

In 2020, Ortiz starred in the acclaimed Hulu series Love, Victor as Isabel Salazar, mother of the title character Victor Salazar. Her role is acclaimed by critics.

Personal life
Ortiz married musician Noah Lebenzon on June 7, 2007 in Rincón, Puerto Rico. Their daughter Paloma was born June 25, 2009. Their second child, son Rafael, was born on September 24, 2011.

Ortiz is active in raising awareness against domestic abuse, citing her own experiences when she was in her 20s and involved in a romantic relationship that turned physically abusive. In an article for USA Today, Ortiz notes that the final scene from the Ugly Betty episode "How Betty Got Her Grieve Back", in which Hilda sat on her bed staring at the bathroom after realizing that Santos had died, was drawn from that experience: "I used some of that subconsciously ... It's something that is always with me".

Filmography

Film

Television

Awards and nominations

References

External links

1971 births
Actresses from New York City
American film actresses
American people of Irish descent
American television actresses
American actresses of Puerto Rican descent
Hispanic and Latino American actresses
Living people
University of the Arts (Philadelphia) alumni
American stage actresses
20th-century American actresses
21st-century American actresses